A production artist is a technical and creative position in a creative profession. The job title originated at advertising agencies, assigning what was known as paste-up work (now prepress production) to the position. Production artists work closely with the designer and art director to execute the design. What distinguishes "production art" from design is opportunities to utilize prepress knowledge into creativity and design training in the work involved. The degree of technical knowledge required for some production art work may be comparable to higher skilled engineering, especially with computers.

The position was once exclusive to print media electronic media such as web pages and CD-ROMs. Skill requirements for a production artist are creative, print production, and working knowledge in using art software of creative industries. Job descriptions for production artists are usually tailored to a company's specific needs. Alternate job titles such as multimedia specialist have been used to expand the role of production artists to multimedia development.  Entry level multimedia work may include data entry or basic skill level programming tasks.

In companies that provide mass printing on paper, novelty items, and out-of-home advertising printing, this position requires an encyclopedic knowledge of pre-press and printing standards through variety of methods. In such companies, it is often a higher paid position than a junior graphic designer or desktop publisher, as it requires more specific knowledge than gathering digital assets and exporting files to standardized image file formats or page description languages such as Adobe Portable Document Format.

Per Comic Book historian Mark Evanier, in that industry the position generally has involved into "lettering corrections, art touch-ups, laying out advertising and other editorial material and generally doing whatever in the office required the services of someone who could draw a little."

Production assistant is a similar position in the film industry.

References

Printing occupations

Advertising occupations